A faqīh (plural fuqahā, pl. ‏‎) is an Islamic jurist, an expert in fiqh, or Islamic jurisprudence and Islamic Law.

Definition

Islamic jurisprudence or fiqh is the human understanding of the Sharia (believed by Muslims to represent divine law as revealed in the Quran and the Sunnah (the teachings and practices of the Islamic prophet Muhammad). Sharia expanded and developed by interpretation (ijtihad) of the Quran and Sunnah by Islamic jurists (Ulema) and implemented by the rulings (Fatwa) of jurists on questions presented to them.

Fiqh deals with the observance of rituals, morals and social legislation in Islam. In the modern era there are four prominent schools (madh'hab) of fiqh within Sunni practice and two (or three) within Shi'a practice.

The historian Ibn Khaldun describes fiqh as "knowledge of the rules of God which concern the actions of persons who own themselves bound to obey the law respecting what is required (wajib), sinful (haraam), recommended (mandūb), disapproved (makrūh) or neutral (mubah)". This definition is consistent amongst the jurists.

Another definition of fiqh is "Knowledge of legislative rulings, pertaining to the actions of man, as derived from their detailed evidences."

"Legislative rulings..." here excludes rulings that are purely theoretical in nature, such as those found in the science of uṣūl al-fiqh, as well as those theological in nature, generally discussed in the books of Aqidah or Kalam.
"derived from their detailed evidences" here connotes two things:
that there is a method of derivation; and,
that the source for such derivation are the various evidences considered valid Islamically.

Methods of derivation
Methods of derivation are laid out in the books of uṣūl al-fiqh (principles of fiqh), and those evidences which are deemed valid for deriving rulings from are many in number. Four of them are agreed upon by the vast majority of jurists. They are:
 The Qur'an
 The Sunnah
 Ijma' or Consensus
 Qiyas or Analogy

These four types of evidence are seen as acceptable by the vast majority of Jurists from both the schools of Sunni Jurists (the Hanafi, Maliki, Shafi'i, and Hanbali and sometimes the Zahiriyah), as well as Shi'a Jurists. However, Zahiriyah or Literalists do not see Qiyas as valid.

While Twelver Shia see edicts of the Twelve Imams as holding the same weight as the Quran and Sunnah, this is unacceptable by Sunni Jurists.

Conditions for being a faqīh
The faqīh is one who has fulfilled the conditions for Ijtihad either in their entirety or in piecemeal.  In the Sunni point of view it is generally held that there are either no (or very few) Jurists or Fuqaha that have reached the level of Mujtahid Mutlaq in our day and age. In the Twelver (Ithna Asheri) Shia view, each of their Marja' have reached this level.

The faqīh who fulfills all conditions of Ijtihad is sometimes referred to as a Mujtahid Mutlaq or Unrestricted Jurist-Scholar, while he who has not reached that level generally will master of the methodology (Usul) used by one or more of the prominent madhhab and then able to apply this methodology to arrive at the traditional legal rulings of his/her respective madhhab. According to the Sunni Muslim website Living Islam, "There is no mujtahid mutlaq today nor even a claimant to that title."

Below the level of Mujtahid Mutlaq is the Mujtahid Muqayyad or a Restricted Jurist-Scholar.  A Mujtahid Muqayyad must pass rulings according to the confines of his particular madhhab (school of jurisprudence), or particular area of specialization. This is according to the view that Ijtihad or the ability of legal deduction can be achieved in specified areas, and does not require a holistic grasp of the Shariah and its entailing Laws and legal theory.

See also
 List of Islamic studies scholars
 Grand Ayatollahs - Fuqaha throughout history
 Sanatul Fuqaha

References

External links
 Who is a Faqih - balagh.com

Arabic words and phrases in Sharia
Islamic legal occupations
Arabic honorifics
Islamic jurisprudence
Islamic courts and tribunals